We Had It Coming is a Canadian thriller drama film, directed by Paul Barbeau and released in 2019. The film stars Natalie Krill as Anna, a security guard working in a grade school who sets out to Montreal with her girlfriend Olivia (Alexia Fast) to investigate her younger sister Katja's (Sofie Holland) suicide after being recruited into a prostitution ring, only to end up ironically in a cat and mouse chase with a female recruiter (Erin Agostino) who grooms young girls for pimp Jack (Nabil Khatib).

The film was originally conceived by Barbeau as centred around a male protagonist, but he subsequently decided to complete the screenplay with a woman for the lead role instead.

The film premiered at the 2019 Whistler Film Festival, before going into commercial release in 2020.

At Whistler, Krill was one of four recipients, alongside Andrew Dunbar, Ryan McDonald and Andrea Stefancikova, of the Stars to Watch award. The film had its international premiere at the Prague International Film Festival (Febiofest) in the Panorama section and was a Prix Iris nominee for the Public Prize at the 22nd (B) Quebec Cinema Awards in 2021.

References

External links

2019 films
2019 thriller films
2019 LGBT-related films
Canadian thriller drama films
Canadian LGBT-related films
LGBT-related thriller films
English-language Canadian films
Films shot in Quebec
Quebec films
Films about prostitution in Canada
2010s English-language films
2010s Canadian films